Frederic Drăghici (born 1 June 1913, date of death unknown) was a Romanian gymnast. He competed in eight events at the 1936 Summer Olympics.

References

1913 births
Year of death missing
Romanian male artistic gymnasts
Olympic gymnasts of Romania
Gymnasts at the 1936 Summer Olympics
Sportspeople from Reșița